Vyāsa is a crater on Mercury.  It was named by the IAU in 1979, after the Indian poet Vyasa.

Vyāsa is an ancient crater, overlain by two much younger craters – Stravinsky and Sholem Aleichem.

References

Impact craters on Mercury